Gonbad-e Alavi (also Romanized as Gonbad-e ‘Alavī; also known as Gombaz, Gonbad, Gumbaz, and Gunbad) is a village in Dalgan Rural District, in the Central District of Dalgan County, Sistan and Baluchestan Province, Iran. At the 2006 census, its population was 512, in 80 families.

References 

Populated places in Dalgan County